Kildin may refer to:

 Kildin Island
 Kildin class destroyer
 Kildin Sami
 Ostrov (air base)